William Pye  (died September 1557) was Dean of Chichester from 1553–1557, a Canon of Westminster from 1554–1556, and a Canon of Windsor in 1557.

Career
He was a Fellow of Oriel College, Oxford in 1529.  He was appointed principal of St Mary Hall in 1537.

He was appointed:
Archdeacon of Berkshire in 1545
Canon of Lichfield Cathedral in 1550
Canon of Wells Cathedral in 1553
Dean of Chichester from 1553 - 1557
Prebendary of Westminster Abbey 1554
Rector of the Church of St Mary, Chedzoy 1554

He was also Vice President of the Council in the marches of Wales.

He was appointed to the first stall in St George's Chapel, Windsor Castle in January 1557 and died in September that year.

Notes 

1557 deaths
Canons of Windsor
Canons of Westminster
Archdeacons of Berkshire
Deans of Chichester
Alumni of Oriel College, Oxford
Year of birth missing
16th-century English Roman Catholic priests